Analytical ultracentrifugation is an analytical technique which combines an ultracentrifuge with optical monitoring systems.

In an analytical ultracentrifuge (commonly abbreviated as AUC), a sample’s sedimentation profile is monitored in real time by an optical detection system. The sample is detected via ultraviolet light absorption and/or interference optical refractive index sensitive system, monitored by light-sensitive diode array or by film in the older machines. The operator can thus observe the change of sample concentration versus the axis of the rotation profile with time as a result of the applied centrifugal field. With modern instrumentation, these observations are electronically digitized and stored for further mathematical analysis.

The information that can be obtained from an analytical ultracentrifuge includes the gross shape of macromolecules, conformational changes in macromolecules, and size distributions of macromolecules. With AUC it is possible to gain information on the number and subunit stoichiometry of non-covalent complexes and equilibrium constants of macromolecules such as proteins, DNA, nanoparticles or other assemblies from different molecule classes. The simplest measurement to be obtained is the sedimentation coefficient, which depends upon the size of the molecules being sedimented. This is the ratio of a particle's sedimentation velocity to the applied acceleration causing the sedimentation.
 
Analytical ultracentrifugation has recently seen a rise in use because of increased ease of analysis with modern computers and the development of software, including a National Institutes of Health supported software package, SedFit.

History

Instrumentation

An analytical ultracentrifuge has a light source and optical detectors. To allow the light to pass through the analyte during the ultracentrifuge run, specialized cells are required which have to meet high optical standards as well as to resist the centrifugal forces. Each cell consists of a housing, two windows made from optically pure quartz glass, and a centrepiece with one or two sectors and filling holes for the sector(s), closed with a screw plug in the housing. These cell are placed into a rotor cavity with a continuous bore, with a collar at the bottom to retain the cell.

Theory

Types of experiments
By applying specific equipment and adapting measurement parameters several types of experiments can be performed.
Most common AUC experiments are sedimentation velocity and sedimentation equilibrium experiments.

Sedimentation velocity

Sedimentation velocity experiments   render the shape and molar mass of the analytes, as well as their size-distribution. The size resolution of this method scales approximately with the square of the particle radii, and by adjusting the rotor speed of the experiment size-ranges from 100 Da to 10 GDa can be covered. Sedimentation velocity experiments can also be used to study reversible chemical equilibria between macromolecular species, by either monitoring the number and molar mass of macromolecular complexes, by gaining information about the complex composition from multi-signal analysis exploiting differences in each components spectroscopic signal, or by following the composition dependence of the sedimentation rates of the macromolecular system, as described in Gilbert-Jenkins theory.

The experiment aims to monitor the sedimentation behavior at a fixed angular speed.

Sedimentation equilibrium

Sedimentation equilibrium experiments  reports the molar mass of analytes and their chemical equilibrium constants. The rotor speed is adjusted such that a steady-state concentration profile c(r) of the sample in the cell is formed, where sedimentation and diffusion cancel out each other.

Density gradient centrifugation

Data evaluation

See also
Ultracentrifuge
Gas centrifuge
Theodor Svedberg
Differential centrifugation
Buoyant density ultracentrifugation
Zippe-type centrifuge

References

External links
Reversible Associations in Structural and Molecular Biology (RASMB -an Analytical Ultracentrifugation Forum)
Analytical Ultracentrifugation as a Contemporary Biomolecular Research Tool.
Gilbert-Jenkins theory
Report on an ultracentrifuge explosion.

Further reading 

 
 
 

Centrifuges
Analytical chemistry
Laboratory techniques
Biophysics
Fluid dynamics